Znamensky District is an administrative and municipal district (raion), one of the twenty-four in Oryol Oblast, Russia. It is located in the northwest of the oblast. Its administrative center is the rural locality (a [[village#Russia|selo]]'') of Znamenskoye. Population: 5,016 (2010 Census);  The population of Znamenskoye accounts for 33.9% of the district's total population.

Geography
The main rivers in the district are the Nugr' and the Vytebet, a tributary of the Zhizdra.

The Orlovskoye Polesye national park is partly located in the district.

Notable people
People's Artist of the USSR Ivan Pereverzev (1914–1978) was born on the territory of modern district, in the now defunct village of Kuzminki.

References

Notes

Sources

Districts of Oryol Oblast